The 2010 FIM PGE Polska Grupa Energetyczna Speedway World Cup Event 1 was the second race of the 2010 Speedway World Cup season. It took place on 26 July 2010 at the Norfolk Arena in King's Lynn, England.

Results 

The event was won by host team Great Britain who scored 51 points. Australia (48 points, without injury former three-time World Champion Jason Crump, former captain Leigh Adams, Ryan Sullivan) and Sweden (40 points, without injury star Andreas Jonsson) goes into the Race-off. Finland (14 points) were knocked out of the competition, but were classified 7th place in World Cup, beating Czech Republic (8 points in Event 1).

It was the Speedway World Cup debut for three riders:  Darcy Ward of Australia (8 pts), Magnus Zetterström of Sweden (5 pts) and Timo Lahti of Finland (0 pts).

Heat details

Heat after heat 
 [59.94] Holder, Nicholls, Lahti (Fx), Lindgren (Fx)
 [60.03] Watt, Davidsson, Richardson, Kylmäkorpi
 [60.19] Batchelor, Woffinden, Lindbäck, Hautamäki
 [60.53] Stead, Schlein, Nieminen, Zetterström
 [59.22] Harris, Ward, Nermark, Aarnio
 [60.37] Ward, Stead, Lindbäck, Lahti
 [60.00] Harris, Holder, Kylmäkorpi, Zetterström
 [60.59] Nicholls, Watt, Hautamäki, Nermark
 [60.28] Lindgren (J), Richardson, Batchelor, Nieminen
 [60.60] Davidsson, Aarnio, Schlein (F), Woffinden (Fx)
 [61.47] Watt, Woffinden, Zetterström, Lahti
 [61.25] Batchelor, Kylmäkorpi, Stead, Nermark (Fx)
 [60.90] Harris, Lindgren, Schlein, Hautamäki
 [61.47] Nicholls, Davidsson, Ward, Nieminen
 [61.82] Holder, Richardson, Lindbäck, Aarnio
 [61.66] Davidsson, Batchelor, Harris, Lahti
 [61.72] Nicholls, Schlein, Lindbäck, Kylmäkorpi
 [62.34] Zetterström, Richardson, Ward, Hautamäki
 [62.22] Woffinden, Holder, Davidsson, Nieminen
 [61.53] Lindgren, Watt, Stead, Aarnio
 [63.22] Richardson, Kylmäkorpi (J), Schlein, Zetterström
 [62.37] Lindgren, Kylmäkorpi, Ward, Woffinden
 [62.50] Davidsson, Holder, Hautamäki, Stead (Fx)
 [61.31] Harris, Lindbäck, Watt, Nieminen
 [62.78] Nicholls, Batchelor, Zetterström, Aarnio

See also 
 2010 Speedway World Cup
 motorcycle speedway

References 

E2